The brown roofed turtle (Pangshura smithii) is a species of turtle in the family Geoemydidae. The species is endemic to South Asia. Two subspecies are recognized.

Etymology
The specific name, smithii, is in honor of Scottish zoologist Andrew Smith.

Description
The carapace of P. smithii is much depressed and feebly keeled. The nuchal shield is small, trapezoidal, and broadest posteriorly. The first vertebral has sinuous lateral borders and is usually a little narrower in front than behind. The second vertebral is shortest, broader than long, and usually with straight or slightly convex posterior border. The third vertebral is considerably longer than broad, subquadrangular, and its posterior border is straight or slightly convex. The fourth vertebral is longest, tapering anteriorly and forming a narrow suture with the third. The fifth vertebral is much broader than the others. The large plastron is feebly angulated laterally. The front lobe is rounded. The hind lobe is angularly notched and as long as or a little shorter than the width of the bridge. The longest median suture is that between the abdominals, which about equals the length of the front lobe. The gulars are usually shorter than the suture between the humerals, their suture with the latter shields forming a right angle. The inguinal is large, and the axillary is smaller. The head is moderate. The snout is short, obtuse, and feebly prominent. The jaws have denticulated edges. The upper jaw is not notched mesially. The alveolar surface of the upper jaw is broad, and the median ridge is nearer the inner than the outer border. There are bony choanae between the orbits. The width of the lower jaw at the symphysis is less than the diameter of the orbit. The fore limbs have large transverse scales. The carapace is pale olive-brown above, and the dorsal keel is usually blackish. The plastral shields and the lower surface of the marginals are dark brown, bordered with yellow.

Brown roofed turtles exhibit ZZ/ZW sex determination, in contrast to the temperature-dependent sex determination of most turtles.

Subspecies and geographic ranges
Two subspecies are recognized, including the nominotypical subspecies.
P. s. smithii , is found in the Indus, Ganges, and Brahmaputra River drainages in Bangladesh, India, and Pakistan.
P. s. pallidipes , is found in the northern tributaries of the Ganges in India and Nepal.

Habitat
The preferred natural habitats of P. smithii are freshwater swamps and rivers. These creatures also prefer to bask in the sun, twice a day. They often prefer muddy areas.

References

Further reading
Auffenberg, Walter; Khan, Naeem Ahmed (1991). "Studies of Pakistan reptiles: Notes on Kachuga smithi ". Hamadryad 16: 25-29.
Boulenger GA (1890). The Fauna of British India, Including Ceylon and Burma. Reptilia and Batrachia. London: Secretary of State for India in Council. (Taylor and Francis, printers). xviii + 541 pp. (Kachuga smithii, p. 42).
Das I (2002). A Photographic Guide to Snakes and other Reptiles of India. Sanibel Island, Florida: Ralph Curtis Books. 144 pp. . (Pangshura smithii, p. 129).
Gray JE (1863). "Notice of a new species of Batagur ". Proceedings of the Zoological Society of London 1863: 253. (Batagur smithii, new species).
Moll EO (1987). "Survey of the freshwater turtles of India. Part II: The genus Kachuga ". J. Bombay Nat. Hist. Soc. 84: 7-25. (Kachuga smithii pallidipes, new subspecies, p. 8 + Plate 3, figures B-C).
Smith MA (1931). The Fauna of British India, Including Ceylon and Burma. Reptilia and Amphibia. Vol. I.—Loricata, Testudines. London: Secretary of State for India in Council. (Taylor and Francis, printers). xxviii + 185 pp. + Plates I-II. ("Kachuga smithi [sic]", pp. 125–126).

External links
 

Reptiles of Pakistan
Reptiles of India
Reptiles described in 1863
Taxa named by John Edward Gray
Pangshura